Juliet Morrow is an American archaeologist and a professor of Anthropology at Arkansas State University in Jonesboro, Arkansas.

Education and career
Morrow was born Juliet Elizabeth Remley in St. Louis, Missouri on April 5, 1962. She graduated from Washington University in St. Louis with BA degrees in geology and anthropology in 1987. She went on to receive an MA (1990) and a Ph.D. (1996) in anthropology from Washington University in St. Louis as well. In 1998 she founded the Central Mississippi Valley Archaeological Society.

Selected publications

2009, Paleoindian period in the Northeast. Archaeology in America: An Encyclopedia edited by Francis P. McManamon. Greenwood Press, Westport, Connecticut.
2009, Paleoindian period in the Southeast. Archaeology in America: An Encyclopedia edited by Francis P. McManamon. Greenwood Press, Westport, Connecticut. Kimmswick, a Mastodon kill in Missouri.
2009, Archaeology in America: An Encyclopedia edited by Francis P. McManamon. Greenwood Press, Westport, Connecticut.
2007,In the Wake of C. B. Moore: The Little Turkey Hill and Harter Knoll sites, Independence County, Arkansas. Field Notes 338:6-10.
2007,The Paleoindian Period in Arkansas, between approximately 13,500 and 12,620 calendar years ago. Field Notes 331:3-9.
2006,New Radiocarbon Dates for the Anzick Clovis Burial. In Paleoindian Archaeology, edited by J. E. Morrow and C.G. Gnecco. University Press of Florida, Gainesville. Co-authored with Stuart J. Fiedel.
2005, The Myth of Clovis, Part One: East vs. West. Central States Archaeological Journal 52(1):51-54.
2005, The Myth of Clovis, Part Two: The Evolution of Paleoindian Projectile Point Styles. Central States Archaeological Journal 52 (2):79-82.
2005, Gainey phase tools from the Taylor No. 2 site (11EF129), Effingham County, Illinois. Co-authored with Brad Koldehoff. Current Research in the Pleistocene 22:57-60.
2005, Neutron Activation Analysis of Late Mississippian Period Pottery from the Greenbrier Site (3IN1), Independence County, Arkansas. Co-authored with R. A. Taylor, R. J. Speakman, and M. D. Glascock. Arkansas Archeologist 44:1-19.
2004, The Sacred Spiro Landscape, Cahokia Connections, and Flat Top Mounds. Central States Archaeological Journal 51(2):112-114.
2003, Ongoing Research and Laboratory Analyses of Materials Recovered from the Greenbrier Site, 3IN1. Field Notes Bulletin of the Arkansas Archeological Society 309:3-6.
2002, Exploring the Clovis-Gainey-Folsom Continuum. In Folsom Technology and Lifeways, edited by John E. Clark and Michael B. Collins, pp. 140–157. Lithic Technology Special Publication No. 4. Co-authored with T. A. Morrow.
2002, Rummells-Maske Revisited: A Fluted Point Cache from East Central Iowa. Plains Anthropologist 47(183):307-321. Co-authored with T. A. Morrow.
2001, The Utility of Clovis Blades for Skinning and Butchering Large Game. Field Notes Bulletin of the Arkansas Archeological Society 302:3-5.
2001, Notes on Ice Age Blades and Blade Technology. Field Notes Bulletin of the Arkansas  Archeological Society 303:3-5.
2000, Use-wear Analysis of Clovis Tools from the Martens Site. Current Research in the Pleistocene 17:101-103. Co-authored with S. Ahler and T. A. Morrow.
1999, Geographic Variation in Fluted Projectile Points: A Hemispheric Perspective. American Antiquity 64(2):215-230. Co-authored with T. A. Morrow.
1998, 1997 Excavations at the Martens Site. Current Research in the Pleistocene 15:45-47.
1997, End Scraper Morphology and Use-Life: An Approach for Studying Paleoindian Technology and Mobility. Lithic Technology 22(1):70-85.
1995, Fluted Point Manufacture: A Perspective from the Ready Lincoln Hills Site, 11Jy46, Jersey County, Illinois. Midcontinental Journal of Archaeology 20(2):167-191.

See also
Clovis Culture
Anzick Clovis burial

References

External links
Curriculum Vitae

Living people
People from St. Louis
American archaeologists
Arkansas State University faculty
Washington University in St. Louis alumni
1962 births
American women archaeologists